São Pedro de Alva e São Paio do Mondego is a civil parish in the municipality of Penacova, Portugal. It was formed in 2013 by the merger of the former parishes São Pedro de Alva and São Paio do Mondego. The population in 2011 was 1,818, in an area of 37.94 km².

References

Freguesias of Penacova